The Torneo Gran Alternativa 2019 was professional wrestling tournament produced by the Mexican wrestling promotion Consejo Mundial de Lucha Libre (CMLLl; Spanish "World Wrestling Council") that ran from October 4, 2019, over the course of three of CMLL's Friday night shows in Arena México, and end of October 18. The Torneo Gran Alternativa (Great alternative tournament) concept sees a Novato or rookie team up with an experienced wrestler for a tag team tournament. The rookie winner is often elevated up the ranks of CMLL as a result of winning the tournament, but there is no specific "prize" for winning the tournament beyond a symbolic trophy.

The 2019 tournament was the 24th Gran Alternativa tournament that CMLL has held since its inception in 1994. Block A saw rookie Fugaz and veteran Místico qualify for the finals. Rookie Star Jr. and veteran Valiente won block B to set up the finals for October 18, which were won by Star Jr. and Valiente

History
Starting in 1994 the Mexican professional wrestling promotion Consejo Mundial de Lucha Libre (CMLL) created a special tournament concept where they would team up a novato, or rookie, with a veteran for a single-elimination tag team tournament. The tournament was called El Torneo Gran Alternativa, or "The Great Alternative Tournament" and became a recurring event on the CMLL calendar. CMLL did not hold a Gran Alternativa tournament in 1997 and 2000 held on each year from 2001 through 2014, opting not to hold a tournament in 2015. The 2019 Gran Alternativa tournament was the 21st overall Gran Alternativa tournament. All tournaments have been held in Arena México, CMLL's main venue and has taken place on Friday nights, with the 2016 tournament being the only time the Gran Alternativa was held on Tuesday nights. The 2019 Gran Alternativa tournament was the 24th tournament held by CMLL in the 25 years since the first installment.

Tournament background
The tournament featured 15 professional wrestling matches with different wrestlers teaming up, some of which were involved in pre-existing scripted feuds or storylines while others are simply paired up for the tournament. Wrestlers portrayed either villains (referred to as Rudos in Mexico) or fan favorites (Técnicos in Mexico) as they competed in wrestling matches with pre-determined outcomes. The tournament format follows CMLL's traditional tournament formats, with two qualifying blocks of eight teams that compet in the first and second week of the tournament and a final match between the two block winners. The qualifying blocks are one-fall matches while the tournament finals is a best two-out-of-three-falls tag team match. Each qualifying block starts with all 8 Novatos competing in a "seeding" battle royal to determine the brackets for the block.

Gran Alternativa participants

Of all Group A participants, only El Coyote and Espíritu Negro had participated in previous Gran Alternativa tournaments, in 2018 and 2014 respectively. The remaining six rookies made their tournament debut in 2019. Four of the eight veterans in Group A had previously won one or more Gran Alternativa tournaments. Último Guerrero has won three (1999, 2008 and 2011), the first as a rookie and the remaining as a veteran. Volador Jr. has won the second most tournaments, winning both the 2018 and the 2016 tournaments. El Terrible won the 2012 tournament and Mr. Niebla won the 2014 tournaments, While Diamante Azul, Mephisto, Místico, and Stuka Jr. have all participated before but never won the tournament.

Tournament

Tournament brackets

Tournament shows

October 4 Super Viernes

October 11 Super Viernes

October 18 Super Viernes

References

2019 in professional wrestling
2019 in Mexico
CMLL Torneo Gran Alternativa
October 2019 events in Mexico